Georgia's state elections were held on November 8, 2016.

All 180 seats of the Georgia House of Representatives and all 56 seats of the Georgia Senate were up for election.

Federal Elections

Presidential election

Results

U.S. House

U.S. Senate

Public Service Commission

District 2

Incumbent Tim Echols (R) defeated challengers Kellie Austin and Michelle Miller in the May 24 Republican primary. Echols defeated Libertarian Eric Hoskins in the general election, with no Democrat filing for the contest.

General Assembly

Summary
Senate

House of Representatives

Senate

House of Representatives

Sources: Georgia Secretary of State, Ballotpedia

References

 
Georgia